Illuminate is the second studio album and fourth album overall by David Crowder Band recorded for sixstepsrecords, released in September 2003.

Critical reception

Illuminate garnered critical acclaim from music critics. At CCM Magazine, Dan MacIntosh graded the album a B commenting that listeners will discover first and foremost the vulnerable vocalist in David Crowder, and then discover "ultimately it's the diversity of songs and creativity in arrangements that set Illuminate apart as a shining example of modern praise & worship." Tom Lennie of Cross Rhythms gave the album a perfect ten squares noting the "rare combination of passion and sensitivity." At Christianity Today, Russ Breimeier gave it a three-and-a-half stars affirming that "If the success of their last album is any indicator, Illuminate is bound to be a smash."

At Jesus Freak Hideout, founder John DiBiase gave the album four stars highlighting that "Illuminate not only is an excellent worship record and one of the best in the genre released this year, but easily solidifies Crowder's position as one of the foremost leaders in modern worship music today." Jared Johnson of Allmusic gave the album four-and-a-half stars alluding to how the "brilliant innovative sound" making the band ride "a sonic edge that is helping lead modern worship into new, uncharted territory" and that "There's too much in them begging to be heard" for them to stay quiet. At The Phantom Tollbooth, Kevin Mathews noting that "As with Can You Hear Us?, Illuminate is an important milestone for God-centric rock music as it proves that worship music need not be bandwagonesque or impersonal or lacking in artistic depth."

Track listing

Personnel

Adapted from liner notes:
 David Crowder – lead vocals, acoustic guitar
 Jack Parker – electric guitar, key, backing vocals
 Jason Soley – electric guitar, backing vocals
 Mike Dodson – bass, electric guitar
 Mike Hogan – violin, turn-tables
 B-Wack – drums, percussion, programming

Producer Zach Lind, the drummer of the band Jimmy Eat World, also plays the drums on select tracks.

Chart Positions

References

External Links 
 

2003 albums
David Crowder Band albums